Kathleen Nord (later Schwartz, 26 December 1965 – 24 February 2022) was a butterfly and medley swimmer from East Germany. She won the gold medal in the 200 m butterfly at the 1988 Summer Olympics and finished fifth in the 400 m individual medley. Between 1982 and 1989 she won six gold, two silver and three bronze medals in individual medley and butterfly events at European and world championships. She missed the 1984 Summer Olympics due to their boycott by East Germany and competed at the Friendship Games instead, winning a silver medal in the 400 m individual medley.

She started swimming aged six, had her first international competition at age 13, her first medal at world championships at 16, and retired at 25 in 1990, though she briefly resumed competing in 1995–1996 in the United States. 

In the early 1990s she studied law at a university, but when the courses were halted in 1992 as a result of the unification of East and West Germany she went to the Palm Beach Community College in Florida. Nord died on 24 February 2022, at the age of 56.

References

External links 
 
 

1965 births
2022 deaths
Sportspeople from Magdeburg
Olympic swimmers of East Germany
East German female medley swimmers
East German female butterfly swimmers
Swimmers at the 1988 Summer Olympics
Olympic gold medalists for East Germany
Medalists at the 1988 Summer Olympics
World Aquatics Championships medalists in swimming
European Aquatics Championships medalists in swimming
Olympic gold medalists in swimming